Pilch is a surname. Notable people with the name include:

 Adalbert Pilch (1917–2004), Austrian painter and graphic artist
 Adam Pilch (1965–2010), Polish military chaplain
 Adolf Pilch (1914–2000), Polish resistance fighter
 David Pilch (born 1943), English cricketer
 Fuller Pilch (1804–1870), English cricketer
 Hartmut Pilch (born 1963), interpreter, translator, software developer
 Herbert Pilch (born 1927), German linguist
 Jerzy Pilch (born 1952), Polish writer and journalist
 John Pilch (1925-1991), American basketball player
 Karilyn Pilch (born 1986), American ice hockey manager
 Łukasz Pilch (born 1978), Polish guitarist
 Nathaniel Pilch (1793–1881), English cricketer
 William Pilch (cricketer, born 1794) (1794–1866), English cricketer
 William Pilch (cricketer, born 1820) (1820–1882), English cricketer

See also
 
 Public Interest Law Clearing House (otherwise 'PILCH'), a legal referral service based in Melbourne, Australia
 Yellow-eye mullet, also known as pilch

Polish-language surnames